The Joint Rapid Reaction Force (JRRF) was a capability concept of the British Armed Forces from 1999 to 2010. It was a pool of specialised units from all three armed services tasked with rapid deployment worldwide at short notice. The force was intended to be capable of mounting operations up to medium scale warfighting. It could be employed nationally, or multinationally under the auspices of NATO, the United Nations or any other coalition.

The JRRF was an initiative in the 1998 Strategic Defence Review. An initial rapid reaction capability was declared in April 1999 and was fully operational in 2001. It was originally intended that JRRF would be able to mount up to two simultaneous operations of up to 15,000 personnel each. A major military exercise called Saif Sareea II was held in Oman in September 2001 to test the deployment of the JRRF.

In the event of the JRRF being activated, the force commander was the Chief of the Joint Rapid Reaction Force (CJRRFO) who was responsible to the Chief of Joint Operations (CJO) at the Permanent Joint Headquarters at Northwood. A Joint Task Force HQ (JTFHQ) would have accompanied the force to provide local command, which was maintained at 48 hours' notice to move. Until deployed, operational control of the various units was the responsibility of the single-service Commanders-in-Chief.

Because of the United Kingdom's simultaneous commitments to operations in the War in Afghanistan from 2001 and the 2003 invasion of Iraq, there were insufficient uncommitted forces to support the JRRF. In 2010, the Lancaster House Treaties gave rise to the Anglo-French Combined Joint Expeditionary Force (CJEF), which restored a rapid deployment capability, although there are no permanently assigned forces. In 2012, proposals were unveiled for the UK Joint Expeditionary Force, which can be deployed as an all-British force, or preferably in combination with other European allies.

Forces
The Joint Rapid Reaction Force can be deployed in three phases. The first element is known as the Spearhead Forces that are kept at a high state of readiness. This is composed of:
The Spearhead Land Element (SLE) of special forces (SAS or SBS), and either a light infantry battalion or a commando group.
The Spearhead Naval Force (SNF) of two frigates or destroyers, an attack submarine and a support ship of the Royal Fleet Auxiliary.
Following that, if required, is the First Echelon, composed of
A Maritime Task Group of major warships
A Mine Countermeasures Group
An Amphibious Task Group which can deploy
A Joint Landing Force drawn from either 3 Commando Brigade or 16 Air Assault Brigade.

In the final phase, a Second Echelon may be deployed, with further major naval units and ground forces from 1st (UK) Armoured Division and 3rd (UK) Mechanised Division.

All of these elements can be supported by helicopters, transport and combat aircraft as required.

Deployments
Elements of the Joint Rapid Reaction Force were activated for the British military intervention in the Sierra Leone Civil War in May to September 2000. The Spearhead Land Element consisted of the standby special forces squadron and 1 PARA plus a single rifle company of 1st Battalion, Royal Irish Regiment, both part of 16 Air Assault Brigade. Also deployed was an air element provided by the Joint Helicopter Command, consisting of four RAF CH-47 Chinooks which flew direct to Sierra Leone from the UK.

Elements of 16 Air Assault Brigade were deployed to the Republic of Macedonia as a spearhead for Operation Essential Harvest in August 2001, a NATO operation in support of a ceasefire ending the insurgency. The brigade also formed the United Kingdom's first response to the War in Afghanistan.

See also
Joint Expeditionary Force (Maritime)
UK Joint Expeditionary Force
Combined Joint Expeditionary Force
Allied Rapid Reaction Corps
Immediate Response Force

References

External links
The Permanent Joint Headquarters (gov.uk) - some information on the JRRF as of December 2012

21st-century military history of the United Kingdom
1999 in military history
1999 establishments in the United Kingdom